Tellis of Sicyon was an ancient Greek athlete listed by Eusebius of Caesarea as a victor in the stadion race of the 18th Olympiad (708 BC). He was the first winner from Sicyon.

References

See also  
Olympic winners of the Stadion race

Ancient Olympic competitors
Sicyon
8th-century BC Greek people
Ancient Sicyonians